Georg Ferdinand Howaldt (8 April 1802 – 19 January 1883) was a German sculptor.

Biography

Howaldt was born in Braunschweig as the son of the silversmith David Ferdinand Howaldt. He learned silversmithing and went to Nuremberg, where he became friends with the sculptor Jacob Daniel Burgschmiet, who convinced him to change to modelling and sculpture. He became a teacher in modelling there and continued teaching modelling when he returned to Braunschweig in 1836. The success out of his cooperation with the famous sculptor Ernst Rietschel allowed him to start his own foundry casting sculptures for many known German sculptors of the nineteenth century. Since 1863 he was professor at the Collegium Carolinum zu Braunschweig, today TU Braunschweig. Howaldt died in Braunschweig. His son Hermann Heinrich Howaldt, also a sculptor, had joined him and continued his work and the foundry under Howaldt & Sohn until his own death.

His brother August Howaldt was in 1838 the founder of the German shipyard Howaldtswerke in Kiel.

Bronze castings
 Quadriga with the Brunswick goddess Brunonia at Braunschweig castle, sculpted by Ernst Rietschel
 Lessing - Memorial for Braunschweig sculpted by Rietschel
 Angels for the grave of Prince Albert in the Frogmore Mausoleum sculpted by Adolf Breymann 
 Memorial Alexander von Humboldt sculpted by Gustav Blaeser, Central Park, Manhattan
 Equestrian sculpture of Friedrich Wilhelm (Brunswick and Lüneburg) sculpted by Ernst Julius Hähnel
 Equestrian sculpture of Karl Wilhelm Ferdinand, Duke of Brunswick-Luneburg for Braunschweig sculpted by Franz Pönninger, Vienna

Gallery

See also 
German inventors and discoverers

References
 Meyers Konversations-Lexikon 1888

External links

Howaldt family (in German)
Humboldt-Memorial in New York
Angels at Frogmore Mausoleum

1802 births
1883 deaths
Artists from Braunschweig
People from the Duchy of Brunswick
19th-century German sculptors
German male sculptors